Chakala (J B Nagar) is a metro station on Line 1 of the Mumbai Metro, serving the JB Nagar neighbourhood of Andheri in Mumbai. It was opened to the public on 8 June 2014.

Chakala station is located 1.5–2 km away from the Chakala, neighbourhood of Andheri. The station is close to the JB Nagar bus stop. Local residents opposed the current name and held protest marches demanding that the station be named JB Nagar station.

History
Legislator Krishna Hegde stated that it would be difficult to change the name at this point, and suggested the name be changed to Chakala (J B Nagar) in the interim. UPS Madan stated, "The Chakala issue is being processed. It requires an amendment in the notification by the Union ministry of urban development. No corrections are required in case of other stations." Mumbai Metro One Private Ltd (MMOPL) stated on 8 March 2014 that to date no official request to change the name had been received.

Upon the metro line being commissioned for passengers, the BEST launched a special bus service Metro Pheri 1 which brings commuters from a distance to the closest of the three metro stations it serves. It runs from SEEPZ and via the B cross road arrives at Chakala (J.B.Nagar) metro station runs parallel to the metro line alongside Andheri Kurla Road touching Airport Road metro station and Marol Naka metro station then via Marol Maroshi Road back to SEEPZ.

Station layout

Facilities

List of available ATM at Chakala (J.B.Nagar) metro station are

Connections

Exits

See also
Public transport in Mumbai
List of Mumbai Metro stations
List of rapid transit systems in India
List of Metro Systems

References

External links

The official site of Mumbai Metro
 UrbanRail.Net – descriptions of all metro systems in the world, each with a schematic map showing all stations.

Mumbai Metro stations
Railway stations in India opened in 2014
2014 establishments in Maharashtra